The Shadow Cabinet of Jamaica (usually known simply as The Shadow Cabinet) is, in the Westminster system of government in traditional constitutional theory, an alternative to the cabinet who scrutinise their corresponding Cabinet of Jamaica ministers, develop alternative policies, and hold the Government to account for its actions and responses. Since February 2016, the People's National Party has been Her Majesty's Loyal Opposition in Jamaica, and its leadership therefore forms the current Shadow Cabinet.

Composition
The current composition of the Shadow Cabinet of Jamaica was chosen by Leader of the Opposition (Jamaica), Mark Golding on December 3, 2020, following his ascension as President of the People's National Party succeeding Peter Phillips.

Mark Golding, MP - Leader of the Opposition; Defence
Julian Robinson, MP - Finance, Planning and the Public Service
Senator Lambert Brown - (Public Service and Special Abilities)
Lisa Hanna, MP - Foreign Affairs and Foreign Trade
Senator Peter Bunting - Leader of Opposition Business in the Senate; National Security
Senator Donna Scott-Mottley - Deputy Leader of Opposition Business in the Senate; Justice and Information
Phillip Paulwell, MP - Leader of Opposition Business in the House; Mining and Energy
Natalie Neita-Garvey, MP - Deputy Leader of Opposition Business in the House; Local Government, Community Development & Sports
Anthony Hylton, MP - Industry, Investment and Global Logistics
Dr. Angela Brown-Burke, MP - Labour & Social Security
Senator Janice Allen - Tourism and Linkages
Dr. Morais Guy, MP - Health and Wellness
Senator Damion Crawford - Education, Training & Competitiveness
Mikael Phillips, MP - Transport and Works
Lothan Cousins, MP - Water and Agriculture
Denise Daley, MP - Gender, Culture & Social Transformation
Senator Sophia Fraser Binns - Land, Environment and Climate Change
Hugh Graham, MP - Commerce, Science and Technology
Phillip Paulwell, MP - Leader of Opposition Business in the House; Mining and Energy
Senator Dr. Floyd Morris - Housing and Sustainable Living 
Senator Gabriela Morris - Youth and Entertainment (Junior Shadow Cabinet)

Deputy Spokespersons (non-Parliamentary):
Patricia Duncan-Sutherland - Gender, Culture & Social Transformation
Dr. Andre Haughton - Commerce, Science & Technology (focusing on Entrepreneurship and Innovation)
Raymond Pryce - Information

See also
Politics of Jamaica
Governor-General of Jamaica
Prime Minister of Jamaica
Leader of the Opposition (Jamaica)
Cabinet of Jamaica

References

Politics of Jamaica
Lists of Jamaican politicians
Jamaica